In chemical kinetics, an Arrhenius plot displays the logarithm of a reaction rate constant,  ordinate axis) plotted against reciprocal of the temperature  abscissa). Arrhenius plots are often used to analyze the effect of temperature on the rates of chemical reactions. For a single rate-limited thermally activated process, an Arrhenius plot gives a straight line, from which the activation energy and the pre-exponential factor can both be determined.

The Arrhenius equation can be given in the form

where
 = rate constant
 = pre-exponential factor
 = (molar) activation energy
 = gas constant, (where  is the Avogadro constant).
 = activation energy (for a single reaction event)
 = Boltzmann constant
 = absolute temperature

The only difference between the two forms of the expression is the quantity used for the activation energy: the former would have the unit joule/mole, which is common in chemistry, while the latter would have the unit joule and would be for one molecular reaction event, which is common in physics. The different units are accounted for in using either the gas constant  or the Boltzmann constant .

Taking the natural logarithm of the former equation gives

The values of y-intercept and slope can be determined from the experimental points using simple linear regression with a spreadsheet.

The pre-exponential factor, is an empirical constant of proportionality which has been  estimated by various theories which take into account factors such as the frequency of collision between reacting particles, their relative orientation, and the entropy of activation. 

The expression  represents the fraction of the molecules present in a gas which have energies equal to or in excess of activation energy at a particular temperature. In almost all practical cases, so that this fraction is very small and increases rapidly with  In consequence, the reaction rate constant  increases rapidly with temperature , as shown in the direct plot of  against . (Mathematically, at very high temperatures so that ,  would level off and approach  as a limit, but this case does not occur under practical conditions.)

Worked example 

This example uses the decay of nitrogen dioxide: 2 NO2 → 2 NO + O2

Based on the red "line of best fit" plotted in the graph given above:

Let y = ln(k[10−4 cm3 mol−1 s−1])
Let x = 1/T[K]

Points read from graph:
y = 4.1 at x = 0.0015
y = 2.2 at x = 0.00165

Slope of red line = (4.1 - 2.2) / (0.0015 - 0.00165) = -12,667

Intercept [y-value at x=0] of red line = 4.1 + (0.0015 x 12667) = 23.1

Inserting these values into the form above:

yields:

as shown in the plot at the right.

for:
k in 10−4 cm3 mol−1 s−1
T in K

Substituting for the quotient in the exponent of :
-Ea / R = -12,667 K
approximate value for R = 8.31446 J K−1  mol−1

The activation energy of this reaction from these data is then:
Ea =  R x 12,667 K = 105,300 J mol−1 = 105.3 kJ mol−1.

See also 
 Arrhenius equation
 Eyring equation
 Polymer degradation

Chemical kinetics
Plots (graphics)